Eyes of Texas is a 1948 American Western film shot in Trucolor directed by William Witney and starring Roy Rogers.

Plot
Kindly Thad Cameron runs a ranch for boys whose fathers were killed in World War II. The ranch is named in the memory of his nephew and last surviving family member Frank Cameron who was killed in Italy.

Thad's attorney Hattie Waters informs Thad that his nephew has been found alive after being cured of amnesia. Unfortunately, the real Frank remains dead as the scheming Hattie recruits a former convict to impersonate Frank. After tricking Thad to create a new will leaving all his fortune to Frank, she sets a pack of trained-to-kill dogs onto Thad with everyone believing Thad was killed by a pack of wolves.

U.S. Marshal Roy Rogers with the help of  Dr. Cookie Bullfincher and his nurse Penny Thatcher investigate the matter to bring justice where and to whom it is due.

Cast 
Roy Rogers as U.S. Marshal Roy Rogers
Trigger as Trigger, Roy's Horse
Lynne Roberts as Nurse Penny Thatcher
Andy Devine as Dr. Cookie Bullfincher
Nana Bryant as Hattie E. Waters, Attorney
Roy Barcroft as Hattie's Henchman Vic Rabin
Danny Morton as Frank Dennis / Frank Cameron
Francis Ford as Thad Cameron
Pascale Perry as Pete - Henchman with whip
Stanley Blystone as Sheriff
Bob Nolan as Bob
Pat Brady as Pat
Sons of the Pioneers as Musicians

Soundtrack 
Roy Rogers and the Sons of the Pioneers - "Texas Trails" (Written by Tim Spencer)
Roy Rogers and the Sons of the Pioneers - "Padre of Old San Antone" (Written by Tim Spencer)
The Sons of the Pioneers - "Graveyard Filler of the West" (Written by Tim Spencer)

External links 

1948 films
1948 Western (genre) films
Films directed by William Witney
American Western (genre) films
Republic Pictures films
Trucolor films
1940s English-language films
1940s American films